Gasdermin B is a protein that in humans is encoded by the GSDMB gene.

Function

This gene encodes a member of the gasdermin-domain containing protein family. Other gasdermin-family genes are implicated in the regulation of apoptosis in epithelial cells, and are linked to cancer. Multiple transcript variants encoding different isoforms have been found for this gene. Additional variants have been described, but they are candidates for nonsense-mediated mRNA decay (NMD) and are unlikely to be protein-coding.

References

Further reading